Scotinotylus sanctus is a species of sheet weaver found in Canada and the United States. It was described by Crosby in 1929.

References

Linyphiidae
Spiders of North America
Spiders described in 1929